Albion Township, Kansas may refer to the following places in Kansas:

 Albion Township, Barton County, Kansas
 Albion Township, Reno County, Kansas
 Albion Township, Republic County, Kansas

See also 
 List of Kansas townships
 Albion Township (disambiguation)

Kansas township disambiguation pages